Catherine Barker is a British ice dancer. She is the former British pairs champion.

References

Year of birth missing (living people)
British female ice dancers
Place of birth missing (living people)
Living people
20th-century British women